The 1982 World Team Classic sponsored by State Express was a team snooker tournament played at the Hexagon Theatre in Reading and the same seven teams as the previous year competed. Canada won their first title with the trio of Cliff Thorburn, Kirk Stevens, Bill Werbeniuk defeating defending champions England 4–2 in the final.

All matches including the final were played as the best of six matches with a tie break frame between the captains if it stayed 3-3. Canada won their first title with the trio of Cliff Thorburn, Kirk Stevens, Bill Werbeniuk beating defending champions England 4–2.

Terry Griffiths made the highest break of the tournament, 123.
 


Main draw
Teams and known results are listed below.

Teams

Qualifying round

Group A

Group B

Semi-finals

Final

References

World Cup (snooker)
1982 in snooker